Joseph Paul Nation (born September 28, 1978) is an American former Major League Baseball pitcher.

External links

1978 births
Living people
Baseball players from Oklahoma
Chicago Cubs players
Danville Braves players
Daytona Cubs players
Macon Braves players
West Tennessee Diamond Jaxx players
Iowa Cubs players
Myrtle Beach Pelicans players
Major League Baseball pitchers
Sportspeople from Oklahoma City